The Fontana was a wooden schooner that sank in the St. Clair River in U.S. state of Michigan on 3 August 1900 while under tow from the SS Kaliyuga.

On the morning of 4 August 1900, the Fontana, under tow from the SS Kaliyuga, collided with the Santiago, in tow of the SS Appomattox. John McGregor was sleeping in the Fontana'''s forecastle and was killed when the ships collided.

Days after the collision, the Schooner Kingfisher collided with the wreck of the Fontana.

No company was willing to bid to raise the Fontana, on account of the swift current and difficulty in patching the hole in her hull. She was blasted with dynamite in October 1900 as the United States government believed that a further accident involving the Fontana'' could obstruct the St. Clair river.

References

Maritime incidents in 1900
Shipwrecks of the United States